Loupfourdon, also  and , is a place name mentioned in the atlas Geography, which was compiled by Ptolemy around 150 AD. Up to now, it has not been possible to locate the place or to determine whether the name component furd refers to a ford. Around 150 AD, Ptolemy, as part of his Geography, was probably the first to map some places in Central Europe in a system of coordinates. For this purpose he relied on the information provided by travelers who had crossed the area then known as Magna Germania. Today only medieval copies of the map series still exist. The resulting inaccuracies led to the fact that the location of individual places was controversial in the 19th and 20th centuries.

Location
Although Loupfourdon is located near the left bank of the Elbe in the map, which was preserved in post-antique copies, at the time, it was identified by the antiquity researcher Carl Peter Lepsius as the city of Dornburg. In other interpretations, Lupfurdum was located in Königgrätz (now Hradec Králové in the Czech Republic) or in Meissen, a little downstream from Dresden. Ernst Förstemann deduced, from the name of the village, a location at a ford of the river Luppe and thus moved the village to the Leipzig area.

In the 2000s, the Institute for Geodesy at the Technical University of Berlin carried out a geodetic deformation analysis. A team led by Dieter Lelgemann assigned many historical place names to modern sites with an accuracy of about 20 kilometers and came to the conclusion that Loupfourdon was located approximately at the site of Dresden. New researches of a Roman military camp in Dresden, discovered only in 2015 (by Karl G. Karusic) support this idea.

Bibliography

Referenced Works

Available Literature

References

External links 

Central Europe
Historic maps of Europe